Eric Klenofsky (born September 21, 1994) is an American former soccer player who played as a goalkeeper.

Career

Youth and college 
Klenofsky played high school soccer for DePaul Catholic High School and the TSF Academy Club team. While at DePaul Catholic, Klenofsky, helped the DePaul Spartans win their first Passaic County Championship in 2012. He was also part of the TSF U-18 club team that won the Super Y-League championship in 2011. Ahead of the 2013 NCAA Division I men's soccer season, Klenofsky committed to Monmouth University to play for the Monmouth Hawks men's soccer program.

During his freshman year, Klenofsky replaced Stephen Graziani as the starting goalie halfway through the season. As a starter, Monmouth's record vastly improved as the Hawks closed out the season with a 7–1–4 record with him in the net. Klenofsky finished with a 0.22 goals-against average and a .914 save percentage. These were both the best records of goalkeepers across the nation, and set a Metro Atlantic Athletic Conference men's soccer season record. During his freshman season, Klenofsky helped the Hawks reach the championship game of the 2013 MAAC Men's Soccer Tournament, where they eventually fell on penalties to the Quinnipiac Bobcats.

Klenofsky cemented his role as the program's starting keeper ahead of his sophomore year. Again, Klenofsky lead the nation with a 0.48 goals-against average, as well finishing second in the nation and MAAC in save percentage (.880). Klenofsky was only behind fellow Kicker, Matt Turner. Klenofsky's record in 2014 proved to be 11–4–6 which included 12 shoutouts, which stands as the fourth all-time in a single season at the university. Klenofsky continued his success in his junior and senior seasons earned All-MAAC First Team, ECAC All-Star and NSCAA All-Northeast Regional Honors. He finished in the Top 5 of best save percentages and goals-against averages of NCAA keepers his final two years of college.

Senior 

Ahead of the 2017 MLS SuperDraft, Klenofsky went on trial to Premier League side, Everton, although it was unknown if he was offered a contract. Klenofsky ended up partaking in the Draft, where he was selected in the third round, with the 34th overall pick by D.C. United. Klenofsky was offered a contract in February 2017. He was subsequently sent on loan to the Richmond Kickers, where he made his professional debut on April 8, 2017, in a 1–0 home loss to Louisville City FC. Klenofsky played the entire match. On November 28, 2017 his contract option with United was declined.

On July 31, 2018, Israeli second-division side Hapoel Marmorek acquired Klenofsky from Richmond Kickers.

On March 5, 2019, Klenofsky signed with Toronto FC II. On September 2, 2020, Klenofsky was loaned to USL Championship side Tacoma Defiance for the remainder of the season. He was released by Toronto FC II after they declined his option for the 2021 season.

Coaching career
Klenofsky began his coaching career as the goalkeeper coach at Fairleigh Dickinson University in 2018, where he wrote and facilitated goalkeeper training sessions and assisted with the day-to-day operations. In 2021, he joined the University of South Florida Bulls as a volunteer assistant coach, where he will work with the team's goalkeepers.

References

External links 
 
 
 D.C. United Player Profile
 Monmouth University Bio

1994 births
Living people
American soccer players
Association football goalkeepers
DePaul Catholic High School alumni
D.C. United draft picks
D.C. United players
Monmouth Hawks men's soccer players
National Premier Soccer League players
New York Red Bulls U-23 players
Ocean City Nor'easters players
People from Lincoln Park, New Jersey
Richmond Kickers players
Soccer players from New Jersey
Sportspeople from Morris County, New Jersey
Tacoma Defiance players
Toronto FC II players
USL Championship players
USL League One players
USL League Two players
Hapoel Marmorek F.C. players
American expatriate sportspeople in Israel
American expatriate soccer players
Expatriate footballers in Israel
Fairleigh Dickinson Knights men's soccer coaches
South Florida Bulls men's soccer coaches
Association football goalkeeping coaches